Moses Allen (September 14, 1748 – February 8, 1779) was a minister of Midway, Georgia during the American Revolution.

He was born in Northampton, Massachusetts and educated at the College of New Jersey. He preached at Christ Church Parish in Charleston, South Carolina and then moved to Savannah.  There, he was ordained by Rev. John J. Zubly and William Tennent.  He served in Rev. Zubly's place in Savannah while he was attending the Continental Congress in Philadelphia.  He then replaced the Rev. John Osgood at Midway Congregational Church.  Midway and the surrounding St. John's Parish was hotbed of republican sentiment during the outbreak of the American Revolution.

In 1778, General Augustine Prevost, military commander of British East Florida—headquartered in St. Augustine—dispersed his society, and burned the meeting house and many dwelling houses, etc. When Savannah was taken, Allen was also taken prisoner, and sent on board the prison ships. He was very active both in exhortation and in actual service in the field. He was drowned in an attempt to escape.

References

 William Allen, An American Biographical and Historical Dictionary, Containing an Account of the Lives, Characters, and Writings of the Most Eminent Persons in North America from Its First Discovery to the Present Time, and a Summary of the History of the Several Colonies and of the United States (Cambridge: William Hilliard, 1809), pp. 10–11.

People of Georgia (U.S. state) in the American Revolution
Clergy in the American Revolution
American Revolutionary War prisoners of war held by Great Britain
American Revolutionary War deaths
Princeton University alumni
American Christian clergy
1748 births
1779 deaths
People from Northampton, Massachusetts
18th-century American people
Deaths by drowning in the United States
People from Midway, Georgia